Albertslund is a Copenhagen suburb in Albertslund Municipality, Denmark.

Albertslund is a planned community or new town mainly built in the 1960s and 1970s. The suburb is known for its experimental and innovative low rise urban planning, integrating water and green spaces in the architecture.

Albertslund is connected to the Copenhagen S-train system and has an open-air shopping centre, Albertslund Centrum

On September 25, 2020, a strong tornado hit albertslund along a 4.4 kilometer long and 220 meter wide path. The tornado was rated Low-End IF2 on the International Fujita scale.  Moderate - Considerable roof and tree damage occurred. Roofs tiles were ripped off homes, large trees were snapped or uprooted & a 600 kg trailer were overturned. Multiple healthy trees were snapped, including a birch tree, which resulted in the IF2- rating. A tree was also ripped off the ground and dragged 2 meters & trampolines were thrown long distances. 2 schools were damaged.

website

Notable people 

 Viggo Stuckenberg (1863 in Vridsløselille – 1905) a Danish poet of lyrical and emotional poems
 Amin Jensen (born 1970) a Danish actor and comedian, brought up in Albertslund 
 Birgithe Kosovic (born 1972) a Danish journalist and author
 Anders Matthesen (born 1975) a Danish stand-up comedian, actor and rapper
 Jim Lyngvild (born 1978) a Danish designer, fashion columnist and TV personality, brought up in Albertslund.
 Troels Nielsen (born 1982), stage name Troo.L.S, a Danish musician and music producer
Phlake (formed 2010) a Danish R&B and soul group

Sport 
 Hans Rønne (1887–1951) a Danish gymnast, team gold medallist at the 1920 Summer Olympics 
 Jesper Håkansson (born 1981) a Danish former footballer with 150 club caps  
 Daniel Udsen (born 1983 ) a former Faroese footballer of Danish descent
 Patrick Nielsen (born 1991) a Danish former professional boxer
 Elena Rigas (born 1996) a Danish inline and speed skater, flag-bearer for Denmark at the 2018 Winter Olympics
 Mads Juel Andersen (born 1997) a Danish footballer who plays for Barnsley F.C.

References

Municipal seats in the Capital Region of Denmark
Municipal seats of Denmark
Copenhagen metropolitan area
Cities and towns in the Capital Region of Denmark
Albertslund Municipality